Union Sportive de Souf, known as US Souf or simply USS for short, is an Algerian football club based in El Oued in El Oued Province. The club was founded in 1967 and its colours are blue and white. Their home stadium, El Oued Stadium, has a capacity of 9,000 spectators. The club is currently playing in the Algerian Ligue 2.

On May 28, 2022, US Souf promoted to the Algerian Ligue 2.

References

External links 

Football clubs in Algeria